Ganga Singh Kushwaha is an Indian politician and a member of 16th and 17th Legislative Assembly of Kushinagar, Uttar Pradesh of India. He represents the Fazilnagar constituency of Uttar Pradesh and is a member of the Bharatiya Janata Party.

Early life and education
Kushwaha was born (7 January 1936) in Narayanpur Kothi, Kushinagar to his father Late Kali Charan Singh. He married Smt. Phoolmati Devi. He had Post Graduate in MA, B-Ed from Deen Dayal Upadhyay Gorakhpur University in 1959.

Political career
Kushwaha was two time MLA from Fazil Nagar as a member of Bhartiya Janata Party. In 2012 (16th Legislative Assembly of Uttar Pradesh), elections he defeated his nearest rival Kalamuddin candidate of Bahujan Samaj Party by a margin of 5,494 votes.

In 2017 (17th Legislative Assembly of Uttar Pradesh), elections he defeated Samajwadi Party candidate Vishwanath by a margin of 41,922 votes.

Posts held

References 

People from Kushinagar district
Bharatiya Janata Party politicians from Uttar Pradesh
Uttar Pradesh MLAs 2017–2022
Living people
1936 births